Warangal Monorail was a proposed monorail system to serve the city of Warangal, Telangana, India with a stretch of 17 kilometers, from madikonda, Kazipet, Hanamkonda to warangal.

In 2019 it was approved for construction.

References

Monorails
Proposed monorails in India
Transport in Warangal